Dard is a surname. Notable people with the surname include:

 Charlotte-Adélaïde Dard (1788–1862), French writer
 Frédéric Dard (1921–2000), French crime writer
 Georges Dard (1918–2001), French footballer
 Khwaja Mir Dard (1721–1785), Urdu poet